The Friday Rock Show Sessions is a 1992 live album release of Hawkwind's headline set at the Reading Festival, 24 August 1986.

The set was recorded by the BBC and transmitted soon after on Tommy Vance's Friday Rock Show. The broadcast excluded performances of "Paradox", "Shade Gate", "Choose Your Masks" and "Moonglum". This album was released as per the broadcast.

Track listing
"Magnu" (Brock)"Angels of Death" (Brock)
"Pulsing Cavern" (Bainbridge/Davey)
"Assault and Battery" (Brock)
"Needle Gun" (Brock)
"Master of the Universe" (Turner/Brock)
"Arrival in Utopia" [listed as "Utopia"] (Moorcock/Brock)
"Brainstorm" [unlisted] (Turner)"Dream Worker" (Bainbridge)"Dust Of Time" [unlisted] (Brock/Bainbridge/Lloyd-Langton)
"Assassins Of Allah" [aka "Hassan-i-Sabah"] (Calvert/Rudolph)
"Silver Machine" (Calvert/Brock) / "Paranoia" [unlisted] (Brock)
Note: The banding of tracks together on CD would suggest either medleys or interpolations, but they are in fact segues, with the exception of "Paranoia" which interpolates "Silver Machine".

Personnel
Dave Brock - guitar, keyboards, vocals
Huw Lloyd-Langton - guitar, vocals
Harvey Bainbridge - Keyboards, vocals
Alan Davey - bass guitar, Vocals
Danny Thompson - drums
with
Lemmy - bass guitar, vocals ("Silver Machine")
Dumpy Dunnell - guitar ("Silver Machine")

Release history
March 1992: Raw Fruit, FRSCD005

References

BBC Radio recordings
Hawkwind live albums
1992 live albums